A galactosylceramide, or galactocerebroside is a type of cerebroside consisting of a ceramide with a galactose residue at the 1-hydroxyl moiety. 

The galactose is cleaved by galactosylceramidase.

Galactosylceramide is a marker for oligodendrocytes in the brain, whether or not they form myelin.

Additional images

See also
 Alpha-Galactosylceramide
 Krabbe disease
 Myelin

References

External links

CHEMBL110111

Glycolipids